Events in the year 1964 in Norway.

Incumbents
 Monarch – Olav V
 Prime Minister – Einar Gerhardsen (Labour Party)

Events

1 January – The town of Brevik, and the rural district of Eidanger, are merged with Porsgrunn
14 September – Tromsø Airport is officially opened for traffic
26 November – The ocean liner SS Shalom accidentally rammed the Norwegian tanker Stolt Dagali outside New York, resulting in the loss of 19 Stolt Dagali crew members as well as the stern of the tanker.

Popular culture

Sports
At the Winter Olympics in Innsbruck, Austria, Norway finishes 10th in the medal table, with a total of 15 medals, including three golds.  However, despite sending 26 competitors to the Summer Olympics in Tokyo, Norway fails to win any medals there.

Music

Film

Literature
Odd Hølaas, journalist and writer, wins the Riksmål Society Literature Prize
Tarjei Vesaas is awarded the Nordic Council Literature Prize, for Is-slottet.

Notable births

January 
 

3 January – Geir Elsebutangen, politician.
8 January – Gunn Elin Flakne, politician.
11 January – Torstein Aagaard-Nilsen, composer
14 January – Anne Kathrine Slungård, politician.
15 January – Jarl Eriksen, ice hockey player.
20 January – Osmund Kaldheim, civil servant and politician.
22 January – Christine B. Meyer, civil servant and politician.
26 January – Guro Fjellanger, politician (died 2019).
27 January – Per Dybvig, illustrator and author of picture books.
30 January – Anette Wiig Bryn, politician.

February 
 

1 February – Bugge Wesseltoft, jazz musician, pianist, composer and producer
6 February
 Tone Haugen, footballer.
 Bjørn Erik Thon, politician, jurist and civil servant.
13 February – Are Nakkim, athlete.
17 February – Olve Grotle, politician.
28 February – Hans Morten Hansen, comedian.

March 
9 March 
 Torgeir Bjørn, cross-country skier.
 Unni Olsbye, chemist.
14 March – Kathy Lie, politician.
28 Marh – Håkon Nissen-Lie, windsurfer.
31 March – Villa Kulild, civil servant.

April 
 

3 April – Schirin Zorriasateiny, rhythmic gymnast.
5 April – Truls Kristiansen, ice hockey player.
16 April – Peter Arne Ruzicka, businessperson.
18 April – Nina Mjøberg, politician.
22 April  – Johannes Eick, jazz musician.
24 April – Per Olav Tyldum, politician.
29 April – Thomas Robsahm, film producer and director.

May 
 

1 May – Espen Barth Eide, politician.
4 May – Roy Lønhøiden, country musician.
11 May – Janne Sjelmo Nordås, politician.
13 May – Harald Devold, jazz musician (died 2016).
15 May – Levi Henriksen, novelist, short story writer and singer-songwriter.
16 May – Kim Søgaard, ice hockey player.
21 May – Gunn-Vivian Eide, politician.
22 May – Inge Andersen, sports coach and sports official.
26 May – Jon Gelius, journalist and television news editor

June 
 

7 June – Geir Lippestad, lawyer.
8 June – Tove-Lise Torve, politician.
18 June – Harald Furre, politician.
22 June – Henrik Mestad, actor

July 
 

20 July 
 Martin Engeset, politician.
 Ellen Hambro, civil servant.
22 July – Anneke von der Lippe, actress.
26 July – Roar Engelberg, flutist.
29 July – Atle Pedersen, cyclist.

August 
 

17 August – Eirik Newth, astrophysicist and writer.
19 August – Torgeir Bryn, basketball player.
23 August – Trond Henry Blattmann, politician.
24 August – Nils Andreas Stensønes, naval officer and head of the Norwegian Intelligence Service.
26 August – Aasmund Nordstoga, folk musician.

September 
 

3 September 
 Øystein Havang, handball player.
 Grete Kirkeberg, long-distance runner.
7 September 
 Anita Orlund, politician.
 Andrine Sæther, actress.
8 September – Joachim Nielsen, rock musician (died 2000).
9 September – Morten Rønneberg, tennis player.
11 September – Morten Ørsal Johansen, politician.
16 September – Tine Tollan, diver.
19 September – Bjarne Brøndbo, musician.

October 
 

1 October – Lars Erik Flatø, politician.
3 October – Jostein Flo, footballer.
6 October – Knut Storberget, politician.
8 October – Odd Emil Ingebrigtsen, politician.
21 October – Liv Strædet, footballer.
24 October – Frode Grodås, footballer.

November 
2 November – Jarle Friis, ice hockey player.
20 November – Hanne Harlem, politician.
21 November – Karin Pettersen, handball player.

December 
 

8 December – Christian Hintze Holm, politician.
10 December – Ellen Christine Christiansen, politician.
14 December 
Erik Johan Sæbø, cyclist.
 Erik Skjoldbjærg, film director
20 December – Ulf Erik Knudsen, politician.
27 December – Tor Mikkel Wara, politician.
30 December – Dag Johan Haugerud, librarian, novelist, screenwriter and film director.

Full date missing
Mette Andersson, sociologist and university professor.
Mette Barlie, sport wrestler.
Kristine Næss, writer.
Christian Wolther, artist and writer, playwright, director and pedagogue.

Notable deaths

4 January – Trygve Jacobsen,  Norwegian businessperson (b. 1876)
15 January – Oscar Guttormsen, athlete (b.1884)
16 January – Henry Jacobsen, politician (b.1898)
30 January – Edvard Christian Danielsen, military officer (born 1888).
5 May – Gunnar Kalrasten, politician (b.1905)
7 May – Gustav Sjaastad, politician and Minister (b.1902)
18 June – Egil Rasmussen, author, literature critic and musician (b.1903)
18 June – Olaf Syvertsen, gymnast and Olympic silver medallist (b.1884)
29 July – Gunnar Reiss-Andersen, poet and author (b.1896)
31 July – Otto Huseklepp, politician (b.1892)
25 August – Bernhard Berthelsen, politician (b.1897)
28 August – Anders Lundgren, sailor and Olympic gold medallist (b.1898).
26 September – Einar Strøm, gymnast and Olympic gold medallist (b.1885).
6 October – Ole Aanderud Larsen, ship designer and businessperson (b.1884)
8 October – Ragnar Haugen, boxer (b.1911)
29 October – Henry Larsen, Arctic explorer in Canada (b.1899)
31 October – Kåre Christiansen, bobsledder (b.1911)
27 November – Erling Johannes Norvik, politician (b.1899)
31 December – Peder Alsvik, politician (b.1882)

Full date unknown
Lauritz Bergendahl, Nordic skier (b.1887)
Einar Halvorsen, speed skater (b.1872)
Hans Severin Jelstrup, astronomer (b.1893)
Sigurd Halvorsen Johannessen, politician (b.1881)
Jon Jørundson Mannsåker, priest and politician (b.1880)
Lars Magnus Moen, politician and Minister (b.1885)

See also

References

External links

Norway